Andøya is an island in Norway.

Andøya may also refer to:
 Andøy, a municipality which covers the island and other areas
 Andøya Rocket Range
 Andøya Air Station
 Andøya Airport, Andenes
 Andøya, Agder, an island in Kristiansand, Norway